Joshua Allen (born July 13, 1997) is an American football outside linebacker for the Jacksonville Jaguars of the National Football League (NFL). He played college football at Kentucky, where he received Unanimous All-American honors, and was selected seventh overall by the Jaguars in the 2019 NFL Draft. During his rookie season, Allen was named to the Pro Bowl.

Early life
Allen was born on July 13, 1997 to Kim and Robert Allen in Cumberland County, Virginia. He has a twin brother, Isaiah, and four older sisters. Due to a stutter, he spent part of his studies in New Jersey's special education system. Allen then went to live with his relatives in Alabama, attending Abbeville High School. He was later diagnosed with ADHD.

High school career
Although Allen grew up playing basketball, his uncle convinced him to try out for the high school football team. In his freshman year, he did not play a single snap in a game. In his sophomore year, he started as a varsity receiver, and in his junior year, he was an all-state receiver with 1,150 yards and 11 touchdowns. Allen decided to return to New Jersey for his senior year, attending Montclair High School. He switched position from receiver to defensive end, affecting his recruiting opportunities. During his sole season with the Mounties, Allen led the state in sacks that year and recorded a touchdown catch, as the team finished 11-1 and won the 2014 state title (after losing their first and only game of the season to Pascack Valley). After high school, Allen first committed to Monmouth, a Division I FCS school not far from Montclair, but later received an offer from Kentucky.

Recruitment
Despite Allen leading New Jersey in sacks as a senior, he was still very much under the recruiting radar. Four highly rated recruits who went on to become NFL players—Jabrill Peppers, Quenton Nelson, David Njoku, and Mike Gesicki—were fellow high school seniors in New Jersey. The recruiting website 247Sports rated Allen as a two-star prospect (out of a possible five), and ranked more than 2,000 players in the 2015 recruiting class ahead of him. John Fiore, at the time head coach at Montclair High, actively tried to get Rutgers to evaluate Allen, but the coaching staff there showed no interest. In a 2019 ESPN story on Allen, Fiore said about Rutgers' lack of interest, "Some people just couldn't see the potential in him. Kentucky did, and they won big. I told Rutgers, 'You guys are going to look foolish when he's drafted in the first round.'" In fact, when Allen made his verbal commitment to Monmouth, no Division I FBS school had offered him a scholarship, and no other NCAA Division I school, whether FBS or FCS, had made him an offer.

Allen's journey to Kentucky began with West Orange High School head coach Jim Matsakis, whose team had faced Montclair High in Allen's senior year. Matsakis made a phone call to his brother Louie, who was then on the Wildcats coaching staff. Louie first contacted D. J. Eliot, then Kentucky's outside linebackers coach, who in turn contacted the then-defensive backs coach Derrick Ansley while the latter was on a recruiting trip in the Washington metropolitan area. Eliot told Ansley to detour to New Jersey to meet with Allen, and arrange for an immediate campus visit if he was at least 6'4". While Allen had verbally committed to Monmouth, he was still available for recruitment as he had yet to sign a letter of intent. Allen visited Kentucky and signed with the Wildcats three days later.

College career
Following his junior season in which he had 7 sacks and 10.5 tackles for loss, Allen was named to the AP Second-team and the All-SEC team. After this season, Allen considered forgoing his senior year and declaring for the 2018 NFL draft.  He later decided to return to Kentucky for his senior season. He also dropped into coverage on 141 snaps and allowed just 130 yards on 19 targets without allowing a touchdown. Allen won the Chuck Bednarik Award, the Bronko Nagurski Trophy, and was named the SEC Defensive Player of the Year. Allen finished his career as Kentucky's all-time sack leader with 31.5.

College statistics

Professional career

2019 season

Allen was drafted by the Jacksonville Jaguars with the seventh overall pick in the first round of the 2019 NFL Draft. On May 23, 2019, Allen signed his four-year rookie contract, worth a fully guaranteed $21.8 million, including a $14.6 million signing bonus.

During Week 3 against the Tennessee Titans, Allen recorded his first two career sacks on Marcus Mariota as the Jaguars won 20–7. Two weeks later against the Carolina Panthers, he sacked Kyle Allen once in the 34–27 road loss. During Week 8 against the New York Jets, Allen sacked Sam Darnold twice in the 29–15 win.

Allen finished the season with a team-leading (and franchise rookie record-setting) 10.5 sacks, 44 tackles, and two forced fumbles. Following the AFC Championship Game, he was selected as a Pro Bowl alternate for defensive end Frank Clark. As a result, Allen became the first Jaguars player in history to be selected to the Pro Bowl in their rookie season.

2020 season
In Week 3 against the Miami Dolphins on Thursday Night Football, Allen recorded his first sack of the season during the 31–13 loss. On November 24, 2020, Allen was placed on injured reserve with a knee injury.

2021 season
In Week 9 against the Buffalo Bills, Allen helped lead the Jaguars to a 9–6 upset with a career game. Allen had eight tackles, a sack, an interception, and a fumble recovery on Bills quarterback Josh Allen, becoming the first player in NFL history to record a sack, interception, and a fumble recovery from a quarterback with the same name.

2022 season
The Jaguars picked up the fifth-year option on Allen's contract on April 28, 2022.

In the team’s final regular-season game, Allen scored the game-winning touchdown on a fumble recovery against the Tennessee Titans, securing the Jaguars their first division title and playoff berth since 2017. He was named AFC Defensive Player Of The Week for his performance.

NFL career statistics

Regular season

Jaguars franchise records
Most sacks by a rookie in a season: 10.5 (2019)
First rookie to be named to the Pro Bowl (2019)

Personal life
One of his sisters, Myisha Hines-Allen, is a professional basketball player for the Washington Mystics. Another sister, LaTorri Hines-Allen, played Division I basketball at Towson, and still another sister, Kyra Hines-Allen, played NCAA Division II basketball at Cheyney. An uncle, Gregory Hines, was a legendary basketball player at Hampton when the Pirates were still in Division II and was chosen in the fifth round of the 1983 NBA draft; although he never played in the league, he did play professionally for over a decade.

Allen married Kaitlyn Morrison on April 17, 2019. The two met freshman year of college in 2015 at the University of Kentucky. Kaitlyn is from Ohio and has a license in Cosmetology, as well as attending college for psychology.
Allen has three children with his wife: Wesley, Julian, and Vanessa.

References

External links
 
 Jacksonville Jaguars bio
 Kentucky Wildcats bio

1997 births
Living people
African-American players of American football
All-American college football players
American Conference Pro Bowl players
American football defensive ends
American football linebackers
Jacksonville Jaguars players
Kentucky Wildcats football players
Montclair High School (New Jersey) alumni
People from Cumberland County, Virginia
People from Montclair, New Jersey
Players of American football from New Jersey
Players of American football from Virginia
Sportspeople from Essex County, New Jersey